Tianma Wan is a blackish-brown pill used in Traditional Chinese medicine to "relieve rheumatism, alleviate muscle contracture, remove obstructions from collaterals and channels, promote blood circulation and relieve pain". It is slightly aromatic and tastes slightly sweet and bitter. It is used where there is "deficiency of liver and kidney, stagnation of wind-damp marked by muscle contracture and numbness of the limbs, aching in the loins and legs". The binding agent of the pill is honey.

Chinese classic herbal formula

See also
 Chinese classic herbal formula
 Bu Zhong Yi Qi Wan

References

Traditional Chinese medicine pills